James Alan Scott (born 16 November 1946) is a former Australian politician.

Early life
Born in Kellerberrin, Western Australia, he worked a theatrical set builder.

Political career
In the 1993 Western Australian state election, he was elected to the Western Australian Legislative Council region of South Metropolitan, the first member of the Greens elected to the state parliament. He held the seat until 2005, when he resigned to contest the Legislative Assembly seat of Fremantle, unsuccessfully.

References

1946 births
Living people
Greens Western Australia politicians
Australian Greens members of the Parliament of Western Australia
Members of the Western Australian Legislative Council
People from Kellerberrin, Western Australia
21st-century Australian politicians
20th-century Australian politicians